Nika "Neex" Washington (born August 24, 1991) is a goofy-footed American skateboarder from Inglewood, CA. Washington was featured in the all-female skate video "Quit Your Day Job."

Biography

Skateboarding 
Washington began skating at 14 years. In 2016, she was featured in "Quit Your Day Job." In 2019, Washington placed first in the inaugural Women's Damn Am skateboard competition.

References

External links 

 

1991 births
Living people
American skateboarders
Female skateboarders
Sportspeople from Los Angeles
X Games athletes
American sportswomen
African-American skateboarders
21st-century African-American sportspeople
21st-century African-American women